David Closs McKenzie (born 16 March 1943 in Dunollie, Grey District) is a former long-distance runner from New Zealand. McKenzie won the Boston Marathon in 1967, setting a new course record of 2 hours 15 minutes 45 seconds. He was the first New Zealander to win the Boston Marathon.

A 24-year-old printer with the Greymouth Evening Star at the time, he lived in Rūnanga on the West Coast. McKenzie had won eight of his 10 previous marathons and was voted West Coast Sportsman of the Year for two successive years. Described as "diminutive, McKenzie is 5 feet, 4 inches in height, weighing only 8 stone, 8 pounds." 

McKenzie represented New Zealand in the men's marathon at two consecutive Summer Olympics, starting in Mexico City (1968).

Achievements
All results regarding marathon, unless stated otherwise

References

 New Zealand Olympic Committee

1943 births
Living people
New Zealand male long-distance runners
New Zealand male marathon runners
Olympic athletes of New Zealand
Athletes (track and field) at the 1968 Summer Olympics
Athletes (track and field) at the 1972 Summer Olympics
Boston Marathon male winners
People educated at Greymouth High School